Elman H. "Rudy" Rutherford (June 18, 1924 – March 31, 1995) was an American jazz saxophonist and clarinetist.

Career 
Rutherford played early in the 1940s with Lionel Hampton and Count Basie; he initially took Jack Washington's place in Basie's orchestra as a baritone saxophonist, and once Washington returned from military service, Rutherford switched to alto saxophone. In 1947 Rutherford moved to Teddy Buckner's band, though he continued working with Basie into the early 1950s. He worked with Wilbur De Paris late in the 1950s and appeared with Chuck Berry at the Newport Jazz Festival in 1958. In the 1960s he worked with Buddy Tate and spent several years with Earl Hines in the mid-1970s. He worked with Illinois Jacquet in the 1980s and was active in performance until his death.

Discography
 Billy Eckstine, 1944–1945 (Classics, 1996)
 Count Basie, Count Basie Classics by the Great Count Basie Band (Columbia, 1955)
 Count Basie, The Count (RCA Camden, 1958)
 Corky Corcoran, The Lamplighter All Star Broadcasts (Hep, 2009)
 Earl Hines, Live at Buffalo (Improv, 1976)
 Earl Hines & Marva Josie, Jazz Is His Old Lady... and My Old Man (Catalyst, 1977)
 Lurlean Hunter, Blue & Sentimental (Atlantic, 1960)
 Illinois Jacquet, Jacquet's Got It (Atlantic, 1988)
 Preston Love, Preston Love (Mexie L, 2003)
 Dinah Washington, Dinah Washington Sings the Best in Blues (Mercury, 1957)
 Dicky Wells, Bones for the King (Felsted, 1958)
 Lester Young, Blue Lester (Savoy, 1956)

References
Footnotes

General references
Chris Sheridan, "Rudy Rutherford". The New Grove Dictionary of Jazz. 2nd edition, ed. Barry Kernfeld.

American jazz saxophonists
American male saxophonists
American jazz clarinetists
1924 births
1995 deaths
20th-century American saxophonists
20th-century American male musicians
American male jazz musicians